Zela House, also called Zela House City Theater, is a museum located in the center of Tacna, Peru.  Francisco Antonio de Zela, an important forerunner to Peruvian independence, once lived there.  Today, it is the Salon Museo Arqueologico (Archeological Museum Hall) where ceramic and textile pieces, works of wood and metal, and pre-Hispanic fishing and basket weaving tools are displayed.

The building was given the status of a national historic monument in 1961.

References

 i perú(2014), "Información de Tacna".

Museums in Peru